A Burning Hot Summer, also titled That Summer, is a 2011 French-Italian-Swiss drama film directed by Philippe Garrel, starring Monica Bellucci, Louis Garrel, Céline Sallette, and Jérôme Robart. It was screened at the 68th Venice International Film Festival in competition.

Plot
A painter Frédéric has an actress wife Angèle. Frédéric becomes friends with Paul. Paul and his girlfriend Élisabeth stay with Frédéric and Angèle in Rome.

Cast
 Monica Bellucci as Angèle
 Louis Garrel as Frédéric
 Céline Sallette as Élisabeth
 Jérôme Robart as Paul
 Vladislav Galard as Roland
 Vincent Macaigne as Achille
 Grégory Fitoussi as Lepartenare
 Maurice Garrel as grandfather

Production
The film was the second collaboration between director Philippe Garrel and the French production company Rectangle Productions. It received co-production support from Italy's Faro Film and Switzerland's Prince Film. The 3.1 million euro budget included money from the CNC, the Italian Ministry of Culture, the Swiss Federal Office for Culture, 400,000 euro from Eurimages and 192,000 euro from the Île-de-France region. The film was first announced in 2009 under the title J'ai gardé les anges, which means "I have kept the angels". The title had been changed to the current when principal photography began in July 2010. Filming took place during eight weeks in Rome and Paris.

Release
The film premiered on 2 September 2011 in competition at the 68th Venice International Film Festival. The French release was set to 28 September through Wild Bunch Distribution.

Reception
On review aggregator website Rotten Tomatoes, the film holds an approval rating of 55% based on 11 reviews, with an average rating of 5.5/10. On Metacritic, the film has a weighted average score of 62 out of 100, based on 6 critics, indicating "generally favorable reviews".

Deborah Young of The Hollywood Reporter called the film "dramatically lifeless and uninvolving."

References

External links
 

2011 drama films
2011 films
Films directed by Philippe Garrel
Films shot in Paris
Films shot in Rome
French drama films
Italian drama films
Swiss drama films
2010s French-language films
Films scored by John Cale
French-language Swiss films
2010s French films